Spring Creek, Tennessee may refer to the following places in Tennessee:
Spring Creek, Henry County, Tennessee, an unincorporated community
Spring Creek, Lawrence County, Tennessee, an unincorporated community
Spring Creek, Madison County, Tennessee, an unincorporated community
Spring Creek, McMinn County, Tennessee, an unincorporated community
Spring Creek, Perry County, Tennessee, an unincorporated community
Spring Creek, Warren County, Tennessee, an unincorporated community
Spring Creek, Wilson County, Tennessee, a ghost town